Girindra Mallik (born 1 May 1939) is a former member of Assam Legislative Assembly for Dholai. He was also a minister of state in the Tarun Gogoi cabinet before he lost his seat in 2016.

References 

Assam MLAs 2011–2016
Assam MLAs 1996–2001
1939 births
Indian politicians
Assam politicians
Living people
Indian National Congress politicians from Assam